The 1908 Australasian Championships was a tennis tournament that took place on outdoor grass courts in Sydney, Australia. The preliminary rounds were played at the Sydney Cricket Ground while the final took place on the Double Bay Grounds. It was the fourth edition of the Australasian Championships (now known as the Australian Open), the first held in Sydney and the third Grand Slam tournament of the year. It consisted of a men's singles and doubles event. Fred Alexander won the singles event and became the first non-Australasian to win the title.

Finals

Singles

 Fred Alexander defeated  Alfred Dunlop 3–6, 3–6, 6–0, 6–2, 6–3

Doubles
 Fred Alexander /  Alfred Dunlop defeated  Granville G. Sharp /  Anthony Wilding 6–3, 6–2, 6–1

References

External links
 Australian Open official website

 
1908 in Australian tennis
1908
December 1908 sports events
1908 in New Zealand sport